was a railway station on the Sekisho Line in Abira, Hokkaido, Japan, operated by Hokkaido Railway Company (JR Hokkaido). Opened in 1965, it closed in March 2016.

Lines
Higashi-Oiwake Station was served by the Sekisho Line, and was situated 21.6 km from the starting point of the line at Minami-Chitose Station. The station was numbered "K16".

Station layout
The station had two side platforms serving two tracks.

Adjacent stations

History
The station opened on 1 March 1965. With the privatization of Japanese National Railways (JNR) on 1 April 1987, the station came under the control of JR Hokkaido.

February 2012 freight train derailment
At around 20:50 on 16 February 2012, a freight train derailed at the station after passing a signal at red and colliding with the wall of a snow shelter close to the station.

The up container freight train from Kushiro Freight Terminal to Sapporo Freight Terminal was normally scheduled to pass the station non-stop, but on this occasion faced a red signal to allow it to pass the delayed down Super Ōzora 13 service in the opposite direction. The driver reportedly applied the brakes, but the train failed to stop and was derailed by the catch points protecting the single-track line, hitting the wall of a snow shelter protecting the junction. The JR Freight Class DF200 diesel locomotive and four of the container wagons in the train were derailed, but the lone 25-year-old driver was uninjured. Six train services were cancelled as a result.

Closure
In September 2015, it was announced that JR Hokkaido planned to close this station in March 2016. The station closed following the last day of services on 25 March 2016.

See also
 List of railway stations in Japan

References

Railway stations in Hokkaido Prefecture
Stations of Hokkaido Railway Company
Railway stations in Japan opened in 1965
Railway stations closed in 2016
2016 disestablishments in Japan